Platt is an English surname, and may refer to:

People
Alethea Hill Platt (1860—1932), American artist 
Alyce Platt (born 1963), Australian actress
Andy Platt (born 1963), British rugby league footballer
Ben Platt (disambiguation), several people
Charles Platt (disambiguation), several people
Clive Platt (born 1977), footballer
Conal Platt (born 1986), English footballer
Dan Fellows Platt (1873–1937), American art collector and politician 1873–1937
David Platt (disambiguation), several people
Eddie Platt (1921–2010), American saxophonist
Edward Platt (1916–1974), American actor best known for his portrayal of "The Chief" in TV series Get Smart
Ethel Bliss Platt (1881–1971), American tennis player and art collector, wife of Dan Fellows Platt, 1881–1971
Frances Platt, British biochemist and pharmacologist
Frank C. Platt (born 1866), New York politician
Geoff Platt (born 1985), Canadian ice hockey player
Herman Platt (1909–2005), American businessman and philanthropist
Howard Platt (born 1938), actor known for his role as "Officer Hopkins" in TV series Sanford and Son
Jenny Platt (born 1979), British actress
Jim Platt (born 1952), Northern Irish footballer
John Platt (disambiguation), several people
Jonas Platt (1769–1834), New York politician
Jonas M. Platt (1919–2000), Major general in the Marine Corps
Ken Platt (1921–1998), British north-country comedian
Kin Platt (1911–2003), American writer for radio
"General" Larry Platt (born 1947), American civil rights advocate and musician
Lenny Platt (born 1984), American actor
Lewis E. Platt (1941–2005), American businessman and corporate director
Manu Platt (born 1980), American biomedical engineer
Marc Platt (disambiguation), several people
Michael B. Platt (1948-2019), American artist
Moss K. Platt (1808–1876), New York politician
Nehemiah Platt (1797–1851), New York politician
Nicholas Platt (born 1936), American diplomat
Oliver Platt (born 1960), American actor
Orville H. Platt (1827–1905), American politician, proponent of the Platt Amendment
Polly Platt (1939–2011), American film producer, production designer and screenwriter
Polly Platt (author) (1927–2008), American author
Robert Platt (disambiguation), several people
Ruth Platt (fl. 2000s–2010s), British actress, writer and director
Rutherford Platt (1894–1975), American nature writer and photographer
Sam Platt (born 1958), American football player
Steve Platt (fl. 1990s–2010s), British journalist, former editor of The New Statesman
Tara Platt (born 1978), American voice actress
Thomas Platt (disambiguation), several people named Thomas or Tom
Ted Platt (1921–1996), English professional goalkeeper
Sir William Platt (1885–1975), British army general
Zephaniah Platt (1735–1807), American lawyer

Fictional characters
Bethany Platt, from Coronation Street
Billy Platt from Coronation Street
David Platt from Coronation Street
Esme Anne Platt, from Twilight (her maiden name)
Gail Platt, from Coronation Street
Kylie Platt from Coronation Street
Lily Platt from Coronation Street
Martin Platt, from Coronation Street
Sarah-Louise Platt, from Coronation Street
Trudy Platt, from Chicago P.D.
Yardley Platt, from Harry Potter

See also
Platt (disambiguation)
Platts McGraw Hill
Platt Brothers Textile Machine Manufacturers
Mather & Platt
Plett (surname)

English-language surnames